|}

The Ryanair Chase is a Grade 1 National Hunt steeplechase in Great Britain which is open to horses aged five years or older. It is run on the New Course at Cheltenham over a distance of about 2 miles and 4½ furlongs (2 miles 4 furlongs and 127 yards, or 4,139 metres), and during its running there are seventeen fences to be jumped. The race is scheduled to take place each year during the Cheltenham Festival in March.

It was one of several new races introduced at the Festival when a fourth day was added to the meeting in 2005. Prior to this there had been a similar event at the Festival called the Cathcart Challenge Cup, but this was restricted to first and second-season chasers only.

The registered (non-sponsored) title of the race is the Festival Trophy, and it was initially classed at Grade 2 level. The inaugural running was sponsored by the Daily Telegraph, and since then it has been backed by Ryanair. The event has held Grade 1 status since 2008.

Records
Most successful horse (2 wins):
  Albertas Run – 2010, 2011
 Allaho -  2021, 2022 

Leading jockey (4 wins):
 Ruby Walsh – Thisthatandtother (2005), Taranis (2007), Vautour (2016), Un De Sceaux (2017)

Leading trainer (5 wins):
 Willie Mullins -  Vautour (2016), Un de Sceaux (2017), Min (2020), Allaho (2021, 2022)

Winners

See also
 Horse racing in Great Britain
 List of British National Hunt races
 Recurring sporting events established in 2005  – the Ryanair Chase is included under its registered title, Festival Trophy.

References
 Racing Post:

 thejockeyclub.co.uk/cheltenham – Media information pack (2010).
 pedigreequery.com – Festival Trophy Chase – Cheltenham.

National Hunt races in Great Britain
Cheltenham Racecourse
National Hunt chases
2005 establishments in England